Natalie M. Batalha (born 1966) is professor of Astronomy and Astrophysics at UC Santa Cruz. Previously she was a research astronomer in the Space Sciences Division of NASA Ames Research Center and held the position of Co-Investigator and Kepler Mission Scientist on the Kepler Mission, the first mission capable of finding Earth-size planets around other stars.

Biography
Batalha grew up in the San Francisco Bay Area, and attended the University of California, Berkeley. Though she started out as a business major, she switched to physics after learning that everyday occurrences like thin-film interference (why rainbows appear on soap bubbles and oily puddles) could be described mathematically. During her undergraduate, she worked as a stellar spectroscopist, studying sun-like stars. After graduating with her bachelor's degree in physics, she pursued a doctorate in astrophysics from UC Santa Cruz, and completed a post-doctoral fellowship in Rio de Janeiro, Brazil.

Batalha's daughter Natasha Batalha is also an astronomer. The two women are collaborating on projects that discover and describe exoplanets found using the James Webb Space Telescope.

Career

In 1997, William Borucki added Batalha to the science team and she started work on transit photometry. She has been involved with the Kepler Mission since the design and funding, and as one of the original Co-Investigators was responsible for the selection of the more than 150,000 stars monitored by the telescope. She now works closely with team members at Ames Research Center to identify viable planets from the data of the Kepler mission. She led the analysis that yielded the discovery in 2011 of Kepler 10b, the first confirmed rocky planet outside the Solar System.

In November 2017, the Space Telescope Science Institute selected 13 programs for Director's Discretionary Early Release Science (DD-ERS) on the James Webb Space Telescope. Of a total of 460 observation hours allocated, Batalha's project, 'The Transiting Exoplanet Community Early Release Science Program', was awarded 52.1 hours; the highest of any DD-ERS program on the JWST. These observation hours are allocated to be used during the first five months of the telescope's operation.

Presentations
Batalha presented 'A Planet for Goldilocks' at Talks at Google in 2016. She presented 'From Lava Worlds to Living Worlds' at Breakthrough Initiatives in 2019.

Recognition
In 2017, Batalha and two other exoplanet scientists were named to Time Magazine's 100 Most Influential People in the World.
In the same year, Batalha won Smithsonian Magazine's American Ingenuity Award in Physical Sciences.

She was elected a member of the American Academy of Arts and Sciences in 2019 and a Legacy Fellow of the American Astronomical Society in 2020.

See also
List of women in leadership positions on astronomical instrumentation projects

References

1966 births
Living people
American astrophysicists
NASA astrophysicists
UC Berkeley College of Letters and Science alumni
University of California, Santa Cruz alumni
San Jose State University faculty
Fellows of the American Academy of Arts and Sciences
Fellows of the American Astronomical Society
Planetary scientists
Women planetary scientists
21st-century American astronomers
20th-century American astronomers
Scientists from California
21st-century American women scientists
20th-century American women scientists
Women astrophysicists